Fiona Heather Patten (born May 1964) is a former Australian politician. She is the leader of the Reason Party and was a member of the Victorian Legislative Council between 2014 and 2022, representing the Northern Metropolitan Region until she lost her seat at the 2022 state election.

Patten established the Australian Sex Party in 2009 to focus on personal freedoms after deep frustration with stagnation on censorship, freedom, Marriage Equality and drug law reform. On 22 August 2017, it was announced that the Australian Sex Party would be changing its name to the Reason Party.

Before entering politics, Patten was the CEO of Australia's national adult industry association, Eros Association. She championed sexual rights and health movements for more than 20 years, particularly on HIV/AIDS, after initially starting out as a small businesses owner with her own fashion label.

During her time as a Victorian MP, Patten has been credited for playing pivotal roles in achieving social reforms in Victoria, with examples including the passage of Victoria's assisted dying legislation, the trial of a medically supervised drug injecting room in Richmond, relaxing laws for ride-share companies such as Uber and establishing buffer zones for abortion clinics to keep protesters away from patients and staff.

According to The Age, between November 2018 and November 2021, Patten voted with the Andrews Government's position 74.3% of the time, the second-most of any Legislative Council crossbencher, behind only Andy Meddick.

Early life and career
Patten was born in Canberra, Australian Capital Territory, the daughter of Colin Richard Lloyd "Rick" Patten, an Australian naval officer, and his wife Anne, a Scottish-born public servant who worked for a government-owned telecommunications company.

Rick and Anne Patten had met in Scotland, where the former had been posted, and after her birth Patten spent parts of her childhood in the United Kingdom and the United States, in concert with her father's postings. Patten has two younger sisters.

Patten received her primary education overseas. She excelled in sport and took particular interest in swimming. Upon returning to Australia with her family in 1978, Patten attended Hawker College in Canberra where she studied Mathematics, Physics, Chemistry, Industrial Arts, Technical Drawing, Landscape Design and Environmental Studies. She went on to study Landscape Architecture and Industrial Design at the University of Canberra. She later graduated with qualifications in fashion design and started her own fashion label, Body Politics. The first boutique was opened in Yarralumla in the late 1980s, where she sold her own fashion creations as well as the designs of colleagues in Sydney. During the early 1990s recession in Australia, interest in Patten's expensive collection was received largely from workers in the sex industry.

Business career, 1988–2014

Body Politics
Patten started her career with her company Body Politics. With her large clientele of sex workers, Patten became interested in sex workers' rights, eventually joining Workers in Sex Employment (WISE), a lobbying group, to inform at-risk members of the population about the emerging threat of HIV/AIDS. Patten was employed as an outreach speaker, and would once a week visit brothels to teach the women about safe sex.

From 1990 to 1992, Patten was a sex worker herself. Her initial encounter began at Tiffany's Palace in Canberra, where she had intercourse with a client when another worker was unavailable.

Patten eventually lost interest in her work, which had also interfered with her social and professional life. After working as a female escort in Cairns, Queensland, Patten quit sex work in 1992 and continued in sex education.

Eros Association
In 1992, Patten and her partner, Robbie Swan, established the Eros Association, a peak body for the adult industry. 

The company extended its interests into publications, public relations, business, and political advocacy. Eros was heavily involved in the editing and publication of a political humour and satire magazine entitled Matilda, an adult magazine entitled Ecstacy, and launched their own "sex and politics" themed magazine Eros.

The Eros Association was instrumental in support for the Brindabella Wilderness Project, an initiative to preserve wildlife in the Brindabella Valley and Mountains.

In 2001, the company established the first National Museum of Erotica, dedicated to the history of erotica and the preservation of erotic art, literature, film and photography. The museum was unveiled by Chief Minister Kate Carnell. While the physical presence of the museum was closed in 2002, the collection remained preserved and continued to grow, with over 400 individual pieces cataloged by 2005, and instead maintained a virtual presence on the internet. 

Patten scaled down her interests in the company in 2000 to pursue other interests in advocacy. She returned in 2006, and left again in 2014 when she was elected to the Victorian Parliament.

National Museum of Erotica
The National Museum of Erotica was opened in Canberra in 2001, dedicated to the history of erotica and the preservation of erotic art, literature, film and photography. The museum was unveiled by Chief Minister Kate Carnell, and was the first establishment of its kind in Australia.

The National Museum of Erotica collected works from the likes of Brett Whiteley, Charles Blackman, Salvatore Zofrea, Lesbia Thorpe, Richard Larter, Mario Azzopardi, and more historically Mihály Zichy. Patten expressed that the collection and archiving of erotic, pornographic and sexual art and artefacts is fundamentally different from the collection of non-sexual material because the former was perceived as a rapidly diminishing resource in the world.

The museum housed erotic artistic works, including paintings, pictures, pin-up, illustrated books, comic strips and films, from the United States, the United Kingdom, Japan, Hungary, Russia and Australia.

The museum also displayed a collection of sex toys, including dildos, vibrators and other mechanical devices dating back to the late 1800s.

The museum was closed in 2002, but the collection remained preserved and continued to grow, with over 400 individual pieces cataloged by 2005. The museum now maintains an internet archive.

Political career 1992–present

Patten first sought election in the 1992 ACT general election. Patten contested the second election for representation in the multi-member single constituency Australian Capital Territory Legislative Assembly on a ticket called the Hare-Clark Independent Group, in association with the larger group of independent politicians who entered an alliance with the Liberal and Residents Rally government. Patten ran alongside the sitting member Craig Duby, however both Duby and Patten were unsuccessful in being elected.

Australian Sex Party (2009–2017)

In 2009, Patten founded the Australian Sex Party, which began by focusing on law reform for the sex industry, but soon "broadened [its] platform to include supporting voluntary euthanasia, same-sex marriage, decriminalising cannabis for personal use, greater transparency in government through freedom of information laws, and increasing people’s right to privacy."

Patten contested the seat of Higgins in Victoria at the 2009 by-election. She received over 3 percent of the vote, placing her 4th out of 10 candidates. Her campaign was based on opposing Greens Victoria candidate Clive Hamilton's proposal for an ISP-level Internet filter which would block access to websites containing RC-rated content—that is, legal material which is banned from sale, trade or public exhibition due to its extreme nature.

Patten publicly criticized the proposal. She appeared in the Four Corners episode "Access Denied" arguing that it would include blocking access to adult films such as Pirates—refused classification because of a technicality—that do not depict sexual violence, are extremely popular overseas and are available for download on dozens of websites.

The party contested all states and territories, except for Tasmania and the Australian Capital Territory, in the Senate and six of 150 House of Representatives seats at the 2010 federal election. The party won 2.04 percent of the national Senate vote, over 250,000 first preferences. After the major parties and the Greens, the Sex Party during the vote count were "neck and neck" with the Family First Party for the fourth place in the national Senate vote. The party "outpolled several more prominent minor parties and came within about 10,000 votes of Family First for the Senate in Victoria". After the party's first federal election contest, Patten claimed that the Sex Party was "now the major minor party in Australian politics":

We've polled better than the Greens did in their first federal election and believe that our vision of Australia as the most socially progressive country in the world is equal to the Greens environmental messages of 20 years ago.

While the Sex Party did not win any seats, their preferences were substantially beneficial to the Greens who won a Senate seat in every state for the first time.

Patten contested the Northern Metropolitan Region in the Victorian Legislative Council at the 2010 Victorian state election.

Patten contested the 2012 Melbourne state by-election, coming third out of 16 candidates, receiving 6.6 percent of the vote, in the absence of a Liberal Party candidate. She says the party preferenced Labor ahead of the Greens due to the "anti-sex feminist movement" within the Greens, but that future preferences may change again.

Patten was again a Sex Party candidate for a senate seat in Victoria at the 2013 federal election.

Patten successfully contested the Northern Metropolitan Region in the Victorian Legislative Council during the 2014 Victorian state election becoming the first candidate for the Australian Sex Party to be elected to parliament.

Reason Party (2017–present)

On 22 August 2017, there were reports that the Australian Sex Party would be changing its name and becoming the Reason Party. This was later confirmed, and the Reason Party registered for federal elections in Australia in May 2018, and was confirmed as "Reason Australia" on 30 August 2018.

In February 2022, the state of Victoria decriminalised sex work. The bill passed to repeal offences and criminal penalties for consensual sex work between adults. "The Sex Work Decriminalisation Act 2021 will partially abolish street-based sex work offences and associated public health offences, remove the licensing system and move to regulate the industry through existing agencies." Patten has been referenced as having led Victoria's review into decriminalising the industry and been fighting for reforms for 40 years.

In February 2022, Patten introduced a bill to the Victorian upper house to decriminalise all drugs. Under the proposal police would issue a compulsory notice and referral of drug education or treatment to people found to have used or possessed an illicit drug. Those who comply with the notice will not be found guilty or receive a criminal record. "Patrick Lawrence, chief executive of addiction, mental health and legal services hub First Step, said the bill would ensure those struggling with addiction, who were often targeted by Victoria's drug laws, received help rather than condemnation."

On 20 September 2022, she revealed that she has cancer.

At the 2022 Victorian state election, Patten was unsuccessful in her re-election to the Victorian Legislative Council.

Book
Patten's book Sex, Drugs and the Electoral Roll was published in 2018. It took her two years to write.

Bibliography
Sex, Drugs and the Electoral Roll: My unlikely journey from sex worker to Member of Parliament (Crows Nest: Allen & Unwin, published in 2018)

Awards 
Patten was awarded the 2020   for her achievements in leading debate and securing legislation on many issues of concern to humanists, particularly end of life, abortion safety, sexual health and drugs of addiction.

References

Further reading
 Fiona Patten moves to legalise cannabis, predicts revenue of $205m. The Age. Published 19 December 2018.

External links
 Fiona Patten MLC – Homepage
 Reason Party official party website
 Reason Party – Victoria secondary official party website with more focus on Victoria
 Sex Party vs Family First debate: Sunrise 2 August 2010
 
 
 Parliamentary voting record of Fiona Patten at Victorian Parliament Tracker

1964 births
Living people
21st-century Australian politicians
21st-century Australian women writers
21st-century Australian writers
Australian Sex Party politicians
Australian businesspeople
Australian humanists
Australian people of Scottish descent
Australian drug policy reform activists
Members of the Victorian Legislative Council
People from Canberra
Reason Party (Australia) politicians
Sex worker activists in Australia
University of Canberra alumni
Women members of the Victorian Legislative Council
21st-century Australian women politicians